Tzurit is a community settlement in northern Israel. Located in the western Galilee region, west of Karmiel, it falls under the jurisdiction of Misgav Regional Council.

History
The gar'in that founded Tzurit was formed in central Israel in 1979, with the village established by thirteen families in April 1981. The village is named after the wildflower  Sedum (Tzurit in Hebrew) that grows in the region.

Notable residents
Amir Gutfreund

References

External links
Village website 

Community settlements
Populated places in Northern District (Israel)
Populated places established in 1981
1981 establishments in Israel